SS Samuel Heintzelman (MC hull number 651) was a Liberty ship built in the United States during World War II. Named after Samuel Heintzelman, a United States Army general, the ship was laid down by California Shipbuilding Corporation at Terminal Island in Los Angeles, and launched on 27 August 1942. It was operated by Coastwise Line.

Samuel Heintzelman was en route from Fremantle, Australia, to Colombo, Ceylon with a cargo of 5,644 tons of ammunition without a convoy.  A German submarine U-511 torpedoed the ship on 9 July 1943, blowing the ship apart. The crew, 42 merchants, 27 US Navy Armed Guard and six passengers were never found. The ship sank near the Maldives in the Indian Ocean, at  ). The ship was due to make port in Colombo, Sri Lanka on 14 July 1943. From Colombo she was to continue to Karachi, Pakistan and Calcutta, India.

All the missing crew were declared dead on January 7, 1946. Later a crew member of U-511, Heinz Rehse, reported the day and place of the sinking of the SS Samuel Heintzelman. Some Samuel Heintzelman wreckage parts were found on September 30, 1943 that had washed ashore on to the Diego Garcia Island, an atoll just south of the equator in the central Indian Ocean.

See also
 List of Liberty ships (S–Z)
SS E. A. Bryan
SS Quinault Victory
Port Chicago disaster

References

 Liberty Ships built by California Shipbuilding Corp., Terminal Island, CA.

External links

 

Liberty ships
Ships built in Los Angeles
1942 ships